The 1958 Atlantic Coast Conference men's basketball tournament was held in Raleigh, North Carolina, at Reynolds Coliseum from March 6–8, 1958.  defeated , 86–74, to win their first ACC championship, making Maryland the first school outside North Carolina to win the title. Nick Davis of Maryland was named tournament MVP.

Bracket

References

Tournament
ACC men's basketball tournament
College basketball tournaments in North Carolina
Basketball competitions in Raleigh, North Carolina
ACC men's basketball tournament
ACC men's basketball tournament
20th century in Raleigh, North Carolina